Ayman Zeidan (born 1 September 1956) is a Syrian TV presenter, comedian, voice actor and actor of film, television, and theater. Zeidan has starred in several notable television series and shows, and gained much success in sitcoms. Zeidan is also a regular theater actor. Additionally, Zeidan has had a few film and radio voice-over roles. Zeidan hosted the Abu Dhabi TV game show, Waznak Dahab (Your Weight in Gold), and helped popularize the show.

His life and its origin
Ayman Ghaleb Shukri al-Zaidani or Ayman Zeidan was born on the first of September 1956 in a small town called Al-Reheiba, located 50 km northeast of Damascus. He grew up in a middle-class family. His father, Ghaleb Zeidan,  Zidane was chosen by Zahir al-Zaidani, the last dream of the Zaidan family. His eldest son was a family member of five young men and three daughters. He was the first to reflect on the wishes of his parents. He lived in a modest house.  Not exceeding 60 meters, his journey with the world was difficult dreams and refractions, which is from the village of Damascus countryside, he fled to the city to look for Uncle  to.  He worked at the age of fourteen. During the summer holidays, a mechanic driver, a restaurant, and a teacher were in a primary school during his university studies.
He was the eldest brother of actors Shadi Zaidan and Wael Zeidan, his cousin is the scholar of Sharia in the West Amir Zeidan, lived in the village of Al-Rahiba throughout his childhood because he had to move to the capital Damascus for the father's working conditions and there was a first event  Friction between him and the world of theater, where he was working in the summer vacation as a preview of the texts of the theater and increased his love for this area and showed his passion for art and presented the matter to his family, which found he was opposed to this subject at the beginning, and after graduating from high school, he was forced to join the Faculty of Law and remained for one academic year. However, he did not find an acceptance of himself. He joined the Faculty of Commerce the following year, but he changed his life.  The Institute of Dramatic Arts in Syria decided to join him immediately and was then 22 years old and this institute included this year's people became stars at the time like the artist Jamal Suleiman No wonder that these students may be taught by the creators of the world of art such as  The artist Assaad Fadl and  Walid al-Quwatli and the late  Fawaz Al-Sagr entered the Higher Institute of Dramatic Arts in Damascus in 1978. He graduated in 1981 and is the holder of the certificate No. 1.
In the year [2016], Ayman underwent a cut in the stomach, losing 35 kg of weight, feeling better and more able to move and working better.

Art Walk
After graduating from the theater where he was his first love and the reason for his entry into the Institute of Dramatic Arts, he participated in several plays either as an actor or as a director and gave much of his creativity to the national theater and mobile theater until he traveled to Germany to get a course in theatrical production Berlin.
A few years later he became director of the mobile theater, but he decided to try to stand in front of the television camera for the first time in 1983 when the director Maamoun al-Bunni gave him a role in the series Women Without Wings.
The director Muhammad Malas also gave him a great opportunity and a distinct start to prove himself in front of the cinema cameras when he gave him an important role in the award-winning film "Dreams of the City" 1984.

Notes

References

External links 

1956 births
Living people
Syrian male television actors
People from Rif Dimashq Governorate
Syrian game show hosts